The 2019 CECAFA Cup was the 40th edition of the annual CECAFA Cup, an international football competition consisting of the national teams of member nations of the Council for East and Central Africa Football Associations (CECAFA). It took place in Uganda in December 2019.

Participants
The following teams were confirmed to be participating in the tournament. The national team of the Democratic Republic of Congo was announced to participate in place of Rwanda. Ethiopia, DR Congo and South Sudan all withdrew from the tournament in December 2019. The reason was the financial shortages of each respective federation which prevented them from meeting the $20,000 entry requirement.

Match officials

Referees
 Mfaume Nassoro (Zanzibar)
 Thierry Nkurunziza (Burundi)
 Anthony Ogwayo (Kenya)
 Ali Sabilla (Uganda) 
 Omar Abdulkadir Artan (Somalia)
 Mohamed Diraneh Guedi (Djibouti)
 Tsegay Teklu Mogos (Eritrea)
 Sabri Mohamed Fadul (Sudan)   
 

Assistant Referees
 Ferdinand Chacha (Tanzania)
 Nagi Subahi Ahmed (Sudan)
 Joshua Achilla (Kenya)
 Musa Balikoowa (Uganda) 
 Bashir Sheikh  Suleiman (Somalia)
 Liban Abdirazack Ahmed (Djibouti)
 Eyobel Michael Ghebru (Eritrea)

Venue

Group stage

Group A

Group B

Knockout stage

Bracket

Semi-finals

Third place match

Final

Goalscorers
3 goals

 Hassan Abdallah
 Oscar Musa Wamalwa
 Bright Anukani

2 goals

 Mahdi Houssein Mahabeh
 Robel Kidane
 Abel Okbay
 Ali Sulieman
 Kizza Mustafa
 Fahad Bayo
 Allan Okello

1 goal

 Landry Ndikumana
 Cedric Rurasenga
 Haroun Mohamed
 Michael Habte
 Kenneth Muguna
 Omar Mohamed
 Mohamed Abbas Namir
 Muntasir Osman
 Gadiel Kamagi
 Ditram Nchimbi
 Nicholas Kazozi 
 Muzamir Mutyaba
 Ben Ocen
 Joakim Ojera
 Makame Khamis

References

CECAFA Cup
CECAFA Cup
International association football competitions hosted by Uganda
CECAFA Cup